Within the medical specialty of hematology, Hemoglobin D-Punjab is one of the sub-variants of Hemoglobin D, a variant of hemoglobin found in human blood. It is so named because of its higher prevalence in the Punjab region of India and Pakistan. It is also the most frequent abnormal hemoglobin variant in Xinjiang Uyghur Autonomous Region of China. Studies indicate that Hemoglobin D-Punjab accounts for over 55% of the total hemoglobin variants there.

Hemoglobin D is a result of a mutation in the one or both of the Beta-chains that make up hemoglobin molecules.  Having one gene effected is referred to as trait; having two is referred to as homozygous "disease" although the symptoms of this disease are mild.  

Hemoglobin D-Punjab was first discovered in the early 1950s in a mixed British and American family of Indian origin from the Los Angeles area; hence it is also sometimes called “D Los Angeles”. Hemoglobin D is the 4th most common hemoglobin variant. It developed as a response to the selective pressures of malaria in these regions of Asia.

Hemoglobin D Trait
Hemoglobin is the main ingredient in red blood cells. Hemoglobin helps red blood cells carry oxygen from the lungs to other parts of the body. Normal red blood cells have hemoglobin A. People with hemoglobin D trait have red blood cells that have normal hemoglobin A (made up of normal alpha and beta chains) and abnormal hemoglobin D (made up of normal alpha chains and variant beta chains). People with hemoglobin D trait have slightly more hemoglobin A than hemoglobin D. The abnormal hemoglobin is called hemoglobin D.

People with Hemoglobin D trait do not have health problems related to having the trait. People with hemoglobin D trait do not have Hemoglobin D disease or sickle cell disease. They cannot develop these diseases later in life. While Hemoglobin D can be detected without a DNA test, one is needed to ascertain that a person who carries Hemoglobin D carries hemoglobin D-Punjab.

There is no clinical disease detected, however children of affected individuals have increased risk of having Hemoglobin D Disease, Hemoglobin SD disease or Beta-thalassemia Disease. Among the seven known types of Hemoglobin D, only Hemoglobin D Punjab can cause a serious hemoglobin disorder.

Symptoms
Even homozygous Hemoglobin D disease does not typically cause clinically significant symptoms. Occasionally it can cause mild haemolytic anaemia and mild splenomegaly. The anemia usually occurs in the first few months of life, as fetal hemoglobin decreases and hemoglobin D increases.

Hb D-Punjab becomes significant when it is co-inherited with Hb S or B thalassemia.

See also
 Hb S
 Hb C
 Hb E
 Hb Lepore

References

1. Tyagi S, Marwaha N, Parmar V, Basu S. Sickle cell hemoglobin-D Punjab disease (Compound Heterozygous state). Ind J Hematol Blood Transf 2000;18:31-2.
2. 
3. http://www.idph.state.il.us/HealthWellness/fs/hemoglobin_d.htm
4. http://health.utah.gov/newbornscreening/Disorders/HB/Hb_D_Disease_DD/FactSheet_Provider_HbDD_En.pdf
5. www.chime.ucl.ac.uk/APoGI/data/rtf/hb/carriers/b/dp/carbook.rtf

External links 

Hemoglobins
Hemoproteins
Blood proteins